Leucolophus is a genus of flowering plants belonging to the family Rubiaceae.

Its native range is Western Malesia.

Species:

Leucolophus gajoensis 
Leucolophus macranthus 
Leucolophus tobingensis

References

Rubiaceae
Rubiaceae genera